Paul S. Riebenfeld was a political scientist and international jurist and lawyer. He served as a Zionist delegate to the Palestine Mandate Commission of the League of Nations from 1937 to 1939; as Honorary Chairman of the "Louis D. Brandeis Society of Zionist Lawyers"; and as Chairman of the "Policy Committee of Jordan-is-Palestine (International)." He was a recipient of the Jabotinsky Medal. He was a resident of the United States when he died.

For years he argued, on legal grounds, and under international law, for the legality of Jewish settlement in "Judea," "Samaria," and the "Gaza District" — meaning thereby, the West Bank and the Gaza Strip. Contrary to this position, he could not unobjectionally be termed a "right winger"; for example, he expressed the view that "Palestinians" were legitimate Israelis, because they were, arguably, merely Jews and Hebrews of Muslim religion or faith. If let alone, and peace came, the two peoples would re-unite, over time, by inter-marriage.

References
 Feith, Douglas J., O'Brien, William V., Rostow, Eugene V.,  Riebenfeld, Paul S., Halberstam, Malvina & Hornblass, Jerome: Israel's Legitimacy in Law and History, Proceedings of the Conference on International Law and the Arab-Israeli Conflict, ed. Edward M. Siegel, Esq. & Olga Barrekette, Center for Near East Policy Research, New York, 1993,

External links
 "Jerusalem in International Diplomacy"

Riebenfield, Paul S.
Year of death missing
Year of birth missing